Jan-Axel Strøm (born 6 September 1945) is a Norwegian luger. He participated at the 1964 Winter Olympics in Innsbruck, where he placed 19th singles and 10th in doubles (together with Christian Hallén-Paulsen).

References

External links

1945 births
Living people
Sportspeople from Oslo
Norwegian male lugers
Olympic lugers of Norway
Lugers at the 1964 Winter Olympics
Lugers at the 1968 Winter Olympics